The hole-in-the-head frog (Huia cavitympanum) is a species of frog in the family Ranidae.
It is found on the island of Borneo. Its natural habitats are subtropical or tropical moist lowland forests, subtropical or tropical moist montane forests, and torrential rivers. It is threatened by habitat loss.

Vocalization
H. cavitympanum is the only known species of frog to vocalize at only an ultrasonic level. The frogs have eardrums recessed in the side of the skull, with an ear canal similar to mammals' anatomy. It appears to have evolved this higher pitch (more than 20 kHz) frequency of communication to circumvent the background noise of its waterfall habitat.

See also
Concave-eared Torrent Frog (Odorrana tormota)
Javan torrent frog (Huia masonii)

References

External links

https://www.sciencedaily.com/releases/2009/05/090508192231.htm

Huia (frog)
Amphibians of Indonesia
Amphibians of Malaysia
Endemic fauna of Borneo
Taxonomy articles created by Polbot
Amphibians described in 1896
Amphibians of Borneo